Howard Publications was a family-owned company of newspapers in the United States.  It owned 16 daily newspapers when it sold to Lee Enterprises for $694 million in 2002.

Robert S. Howard founded the company in 1961.  As of early 1972, group owned nine daily newspapers.  Lee Enterprises announced that it would acquire the company on February 12, 2002, for $694 million, with a closing later that year.  At the time of the sale, Howard employed 2,400 people, and its papers had a total daily circulation of 479,000.

List of previously owned newspapers
 North County Times (Escondido, California; later sold and merged into The San Diego Union-Tribune)
 The Times of Northwest Indiana (Munster, Indiana)(acquired May 1962)
 Sioux City Journal (Sioux City, Iowa) (one half-ownership acquired in 1972)
 Waterloo Courier (Waterloo, Iowa)
 The Post-Star (Glen Falls, New York) (acquired January 1971)(30 December 1970). Glen Falls Newspapers Have Been Purchased By Howard Publications, Oceanside, Calif; Carl M. Davidson Has Been Named Publisher, The Post-Star, p.1 (paywall)
 Casper Star-Tribune (Casper, Wyoming)
 Times-News (Twin Falls, Idaho) (acquired April 1968)(2 April 1968). Indiana Firm Buys Paper In Twin Falls, The Idaho Daily Statesman, p. 1 (paywall)
 The Daily News (Longview, Washington)
 The Times and Democrat (Orangeburg, South Carolina)
 The Sentinel (Carlisle, Pennsylvania)
 The Journal Standard (Freeport, Illinois; now owned by GateHouse Media)
 The Leader (Corning, New York; now owned by GateHouse Media)
 The Citizen (Auburn, New York)
 Journal Gazette (Mattoon, Illinois)
 The Ledger Independent (Maysville, Kentucky)
 Times-Courier (Charleston, Illinois)
 The Vidette Times (Valparaiso, Indiana; merged into The Times of Northwest Indiana)
 Escondido Times-Advocate (merged into the North County Times)
  North County Blade-Citizen (acquired Oceanside Blade-Tribune (circulation approx. 10,500) in 1967,(30 March 1967) Blade-Tribune sale confirmed by Braden, Daily Times-Advocate, p. 1 (paywall) then acquired  San Dieguito Citizen in 1979; merged the two into Blade-Citizen in 1989, which in turn merged into North County Times in 1995)
 Pharos-Tribune (Logansport, Indiana) (Acquired 1966, sold to Thomson Corporation around 1995 in exchange for Vidette Times)
 San Clemente Sun-Post (San Clemente, California)(then acquired by The Orange County Register in 1993)

References

Newspaper companies of the United States
Lee Enterprises publications
Mass media companies established in 1961
Mass media companies disestablished in 2002
2002 mergers and acquisitions
1961 establishments in California
2002 disestablishments in California